Heteropsis adolphei, the red-eye bushbrown, is a species of satyrine butterfly found in southern India. The species name is after Adolphe Delessert who collected the first specimens based on which the species was described.

Description
Upperside dark umber brown. Forewing with a large, white-centred, fulvous-ringed black median ocellus and a white-centred preapical much smaller black spot. Hindwing uniform, a post-median series of from two to four white-centred fulvous-ringed black ocelli, sub-equal and smaller than the posterior ocellus on the forewing. Underside: ground colour similar, but irrorated (sprinkled) with obscure transverse striae of a deeper brown; the terminal margins of both forewings and hindwings very broadly paler; the dark basal portion of the wings sharply defined by a very dark brown line; a postmedian series on both wings of rather small white-centred fulvous-ringed black ocelli—two on the forewing, a median and a preapical; seven, placed in a slight curve, on the hindwing. Antennae, head, thorax and abdomen dark umber brown, paler beneath. Male sex-mark of form 2, the patch of specialized scales on both forewing and hindwing very small; the nacreous area surrounding the specialized scales on the underside of the forewing very pale brown.

Footnotes

References
 

Elymniini
Butterflies of Asia
Butterflies described in 1843
Endemic fauna of India
Taxa named by Félix Édouard Guérin-Méneville